The economy of Guyana is one of the fastest growing in the world with a gross domestic product (GDP) growth of 19.9% in 2021. In 2022, Guyana had a per capita gross domestic product of $42,647 and an average GDP growth of 4.2% over the previous decade. Guyana's economy was transformed in 2015 with the discovery of an offshore oil field in the country’s waters about 120 miles from Georgetown. Crude oil production started in 2019.

Overview
Developed in conjunction with the World Bank and the International Monetary Fund (IMF), an economic recovery program significantly reduced the government's role in the economy, encouraged foreign investment, enabled the government to clear all its arrears on loan repayments to foreign governments and the multilateral banks, and brought about the sale of 15 of the 41 government-owned (parastatal) businesses. The cellphone company and assets in the timber, rice, and fishing industries also were privatized. International corporations were hired to manage the huge state sugar company, GuySuCo, and the most significant  state bauxite mine. An American company was allowed to open a bauxite mine, and two Canadian companies were permitted to develop the largest open-pit gold mine in South America. However, efforts to privatize the two state-owned bauxite mining companies, Berbice Mining Company and Linden Mining Company have so far been unsuccessful.

Most price controls were removed, the laws affecting mining and oil exploration were improved, and an investment policy receptive to foreign investment was announced. Tax reforms designed to promote exports and agricultural production in the private sector were enacted.

Debt 
Since 1986, Guyana has received its entire wheat supply from the United States on concessional terms under a PL 480 Food for Peace programme. It is now supplied on a grant basis. The Guyanese currency generated by the sale of the wheat is used for purposes agreed upon by the U.S. and Guyana Governments. As with many developing countries, Guyana is heavily indebted. Reduction of the debt burden has been one of the present administration's top priorities. In 1999, through the Paris Club "Lyons terms" and the Heavily Indebted Poor Countries (HIPC) initiative Guyana managed to negotiate $256 million in debt forgiveness.

In qualifying for HIPC assistance, for the first time, Guyana became eligible for a reduction of its multilateral debt. About half of Guyana's debt is owed to the multilateral development banks and 20% to its neighbour Trinidad and Tobago, which until 1986 was its principal supplier of petroleum products. Almost all debt to the U.S. government has been forgiven. In late 1999, net international reserves were at $123.2 million, down from $254 million in 1994. However, net international reserves had rebounded to $174.1 million by January 2001.

Guyana's extremely high debt burden to foreign creditors has meant limited availability of foreign exchange and reduced capacity to import necessary raw materials, spare parts, and equipment, thereby further reducing production. The increase in global fuel costs also contributed to the country's decline in production and growing trade deficit. The decline of production has increased unemployment. Although no reliable statistics exist, combined unemployment and underemployment are estimated at about 30%.

Emigration, principally to the U.S. and Canada, remains substantial. Net emigration in 1998 was estimated to be about 1.4 percent of the population, and in 1999, this figure totaled 1.2 percent. After years of a state-dominated economy, the mechanisms for private investment, domestic or foreign, are still evolving. The shift from a state-controlled economy to a primarily mixed economic system began under Desmond Hoyte and continued under PPP/CIVIC governments. The current PPP/C administration recognizes the need for foreign investment to create jobs, enhance technical capabilities, and generate goods for export.

The foreign exchange market was fully liberalized in 1991, and currency is now freely traded without restriction. The rate is subject to change on a daily basis, but the Guyana dollar has depreciated 17.6% from 1998 to 2000 and may depreciate further pending the stability of the post-election period.

Economic history

European settlement and plantation workforce 
The Dutch were the first to settle Guyana in the 1600s, engaging in trade with the Amerindians and establishing plantations. It was soon discovered that the soil and climate were ideal for growing sugar cane and slaves from Africa were brought in to work on these plantations. The colonies of the Guianas were merged and taken into the British empire. When slavery was abolished, a new wave of labor was brought from India as indentured servants. Politics was greatly controlled by powerful plantation owners. Portuguese and Chinese also came into the country as agricultural labor, but eventually settled into their own specific service industries.

Nationalization 
When Guyana became independent from British rule, there was a great need to ensure the economy was locally-owned after centuries of foreign involvement. Socialist policies were of great interest at the time, and early every sector of industry was nationalized during the Burnham presidency of the 1970s, with new agencies established to support the poor and working class. Initially, government investment was successful to aid growth, but lacked management skills and was weak in the face of world commodity prices and competition. Economic and political strife went hand in hand, and the population dwindled from resulting waves of emigration.

Opening of markets 
The economy made dramatic progress after President Hoyte's 1989 economic recovery program. As a result, Guyana's GDP increased 6% in 1991 following 15 years of decline. Growth was consistently above six percent until 1995, when it dipped to 5.1 percent. The government reported that the economy grew at a rate of 7.9 percent in 1996, 6.2 percent in 1997, and fell 1.3 percent in 1998. The 1999 growth rate was three percent. The unofficial growth rate in 2005 was 0.5 percent. In 2006, it was 3.2%.

Infrastructure 

Infrastructure is primarily concentrated on the coast, and there is difficulty in building up industries in the hinterlands due to limitations of access and energy.

Major economic sectors
Agriculture and mining are Guyana's most important economic activities, with sugar, bauxite, rice, and gold accounting for 70–75 percent of export earnings. However, the rice sector experienced a decline in 2000, with export earnings down 27 percent through the third quarter of 2000. Ocean shrimp exports, which were heavily impacted by a one-month import ban to the United States in 1999, accounted for only 3.5 percent of total export earnings that year. Shrimp exports rebounded in 2000, representing 11 percent of export earnings through the third quarter of 2000. Other exports include timber, diamonds, garments, rum, and pharmaceuticals. The value of these other exports is increasing.

Agriculture 

Sugar is the most historically important product of Guyana, however, the industry has been in decline due to global competition and other factors. It still is a major export, along with its related products molasses and rum. Banks DIH and Demerara Distilleries are the countries' only distillers, but Guyana is world’s 14th largest exporter of rum.

In 2018, Guyana produced 1.2 million tons of sugar cane, 964 thousand tons of rice, 136 thousand tons of coconut, in addition to smaller productions of other products agricultural products, such as eggplant (47 thousand tons), pineapple (34 thousand tons), pepper (37 thousand tons), banana (23 thousand tons), orange (21 thousand tons), cassava (20 thousand tons), etc.

Mining 

Mining has surpassed the economic importance of sugar in recent years, making up a sizable portion of Guyana's GDP. The large-scale gold and bauxite mining operations are all foreign-owned, but the vast proportion of gold and diamond mining is done by small and medium-scale miners.

Petroleum 

In the 2010's, significant off-shore oil finds by Exxon has renewed interest in foreign investment in the country. A 2018 estimate predicts Guyana's oilfields are holding over 3.2 billion barrels. Off-shore crude oil extraction began in 2019.

Forestry 
Guyana contains the "largest unspoiled rainforests on the continent." Despite the vast forests covering the country, the timber industry has remained small due to infrastructural limitations such as undeveloped roads and lacking or unreliable electricity to milling operations.

The country also sees large financial contributions from international organizations looking to protect the forests.

Fishing 
Most of what is fished is consumed locally, but there is a sizable export market for ocean shrimp. Overfishing of shrimp has led to Atlantic seabob becoming the most commercially important catch.  Commercial fishing is mostly marine, as inland fishing is mostly attributed to subsistence fishing done by Amerindians.

Data 
The following table shows the main economic indicators in 1980–2022 (with IMF staff estimates for 2020–2027). Inflation below 3% is in green.

See also 

 Guyanese dollar
 Bank of Guyana
 List of Guyanese companies
 Economy of South America
 Aurora gold mine
 Omai mine
 Toroparu mine
 Petroleum exploration in Guyana

References 

 
Guyana